Claudine Mendy (born 8 January 1990, in Mantes-la-Jolie, France) is a French handball player. She plays for the club Bourg-de-Péage Drôme Handball and for the French national team. In the upcoming 2015-2016 season the left back will play for Handball Cercle Nimes.

She participated at the 2009 World Women's Handball Championship in China, winning a silver medal with the French team.  She was also part of the French team at the 2012 Summer Olympics.

References

External links

1990 births
Living people
French female handball players
Handball players at the 2012 Summer Olympics
Olympic handball players of France